Statistics of Southern New England Soccer League in season 1915–16.

League standings
                           GP   W   L   T   PTS
 Fall River Pan Americans 
 J&P Coats 
 New Bedford Celtics
 New Bedford Whalers
 Howard & Bullough F.C.
 Fall River Rovers
 Fore River

References
Southern New England Soccer League (RSSSF)

1915-16
1915–16 domestic association football leagues
1915–16 in American soccer